Léo Rocco (1894 – 15 January 1976) was a Swiss architect. His work was part of the architecture event in the art competition at the 1924 Summer Olympics.

References

1894 births
1976 deaths
19th-century Swiss architects
20th-century Swiss architects
Olympic competitors in art competitions